The Grumman American AA-1 series is a family of light, two-seat aircraft. The family includes the original American Aviation AA-1 Yankee and AA-1A Trainer, the Grumman American AA-1B Trainer and TR-2, plus the Gulfstream American AA-1C Lynx and T-Cat.

Development history
The Yankee was originally designed in 1962 by Jim Bede as the BD-1 and was intended to be sold as a kit-built aircraft. Bede decided to certify the design under the then-new FAR Part 23 rules and offer it as a completed aircraft. No BD-1 kits were ever sold.

The prototype first flew on July 11, 1963, and featured folding wings for trailering and ease of storage. Bede formed a company, Bede Aviation Corporation, based in Cleveland, Ohio, to produce the aircraft, but the BD-1 never entered production as a certified aircraft. At that time the FAA was hesitant to certify a light aircraft with folding wings. The certification process was complex and expensive and disagreements arose between Bede and the other shareholders. As a result, Bede was ousted by his business partners and the company renamed American Aviation.

AA-1 Yankee Clipper

American's engineers reworked the wing to a non-folding design, easing FAR Part 23 certification. Other changes included adding extended wing tips to improve rate-of-climb, an anti-servo tab on the elevator along with a centering spring system to increase longitudinal stability and stall strips to improve handling during a stall. The company designated the redesigned aircraft the AA-1 Yankee Clipper.

The AA-1 was certified under FAR Part 23 on August 29, 1967, with the first production AA-1 flying on May 30, 1968. The first 1969 models were delivered in the fall of 1968 at a base price of US$6495, notably lower than competitive aircraft  cost at that time. American Aviation built 459 examples of the AA-1 Yankee Clipper between 1969 and 1971 at their factory in Cleveland, Ohio.

AA-1A Trainer

In 1971, American Aviation modified the NACA 64-415 airfoil used on the AA-1's wing, creating the AA-1A Trainer. The recontoured leading edge produced softer stall characteristics and permitted lower approach speeds.  While this did tame the AA-1's sharp stall, it also reduced the cruise speed compared to the original AA-1 by 10 mph. First flight was on March 25, 1970,  and 470 AA-1As were built in 1971–72.

AA-1B Trainer and TR-2

Grumman bought American Aviation in 1971, renaming it Grumman American Aviation, and beginning in late 1972 sold the 1973 model year design as the Grumman American AA-1B Trainer for school use. The variant designed for the personal-use market was called the TR-2 and it featured a standard radio and trim package. The AA-1B was produced until 1976. 680 AA-1Bs were produced.

All the AA-1s, AA-1As and AA-1Bs were powered by the Lycoming O-235-C2C low-compression engine designed for 80/87 avgas, which produced 108 hp.

AA-1C Lynx and T-Cat

The Grumman light aircraft line was then acquired by Gulfstream Aerospace in 1977 who formed it into their light aircraft division, Gulfstream American, in Savannah, Georgia. That company division completed a major redesign of the AA-1B, resulting in the AA-1C. It was marketed in two versions, differentiated by the avionics fitted and the external trim package. The Lynx was targeted at private owners while the T-Cat was the flying school trainer. These names were chosen to position the aircraft in the Gulfstream American line which, at that time featured the Cheetah, Tiger and the Cougar.

The AA-1C received a new larger horizontal tail and other significant improvements, including a 115 hp Lycoming O-235-L2C high-compression engine designed for 100LL fuel, which brought the cruise speed back up to that of the original 108 hp Yankee. 211 AA-1Cs were produced in 1977 and 1978.

The last AA-1C was produced by Gulfstream American in 1978. Overall, 1820 AA-1 family aircraft were built between 1969 and 1978.

The type certificate for the AA-1 family of aircraft is currently held by True Flight Holdings LLC who bought the assets of Tiger Aircraft on August 2, 2007.

Features
All models of the AA-1 accommodate two people in side-by-side seating under a sliding canopy and are noted for their exceptionally light handling. The Yankee and its four-seater siblings, the AA-5 series, feature a unique bonded aluminum honeycomb fuselage and bonded wings that eliminate the need for rivets without sacrificing strength. The wide-track main landing gear struts are laminated fiberglass for shock absorption, marketed as the "Face Saver" design by American Aviation.

The Yankee was originally designed to minimize the number of airframe parts used, with the aim of simplifying production and saving money. As a result of this philosophy, many parts were interchangeable. Due to the use of a non-tapered tubular spar, which doubled as the fuel tank, and the lack of wing washout, the wings could be exchanged left and right. The fin and horizontal stabilizers were interchangeable, as were the rudder and the elevators. The ailerons and flaps were similarly the same part. While it did succeed in making production easier, this design philosophy produced many aerodynamic compromises in the design. For instance, because the flaps were the same part as the ailerons they were too small to be effective as flaps. The lack of wing washout, necessitated by the wing interchangeability requirement, meant that stall strips had to be installed to produce acceptable stall characteristics for certification. Over time this philosophy of compromising the aerodynamics in favour of a minimized parts count was abandoned. For example, the redesign of the AA-1B into the AA-1C by Gulfstream involved wider-span elevators and horizontal stabilizers that produced better longitudinal stability, but were no longer interchangeable with the rudder and fin.

Powered by the same 108 hp Lycoming O-235 engine as the Cessna 152, the original Yankee cruises twenty percent faster thanks to the cleaner wing and better aerodynamics.

Safety record
The original American Aviation AA-1 Yankee developed a poor reputation for safety in its first years of production (1969–71). The aircraft was designed purely to fill the role of a personal transportation and touring aircraft and not a trainer, but many of the early production models were purchased by flying schools. The appeal of the AA-1 to schools was obvious – compared to the competition, the AA-1 was faster, cost less to purchase and maintain and, most importantly, had more student-appeal with its sliding canopy and fighter-like looks.

Many of the early school accidents were related to spin-training. Once the AA-1 entered a fully developed spin and exceeded three turns, it was usually not recoverable. The AA-1 had been spin-tested as part of its certification, but in 1973 the FAA issued Airworthiness Directive 73-13-07 ordering the aircraft placarded against spins.

The remaining accidents were generally attributed to the AA-1's short endurance (3.3 hours), inability to use short grass strips and high approach speeds (85–90 mph). These were all different from the other school aircraft in use in that era and took some adaptation by instructors and students alike.

Today most of the AA-1s, AA-1As, Bs and Cs are in private hands. If the pilot is properly trained on the aircraft and stays within its limitations, data show that it is as safe as any other light aircraft.

Modifications

Some AA-1s have had their original engines replaced with larger 150 or 160 hp engines that further increase performance. Other popular modifications include the addition of a dorsal strake on earlier model AA-1s to improve yaw stability or the addition of a transparent red rudder cap to fair the flashing beacon for reduced drag. Some AA-1s have been converted to taildragger configuration.

Variants
AA-1 Yankee
1968 – Production version developed from the Bede BD-1 with a 108hp Lycoming O-235-C2C engine, 461 built.
AA-1A Trainer
1971 – Dual-control trainer version with modified wing aerofoil, 470 built.
AA-1B Trainer/Tr-2
1972 – Development of the AA-1A with an increase in useful load, also sold as the Tr-2 touring model, 680 built.
AA-1C T-Cat/Lynx
1976 – AA-1B with a 115hp Lycoming O-235-L2C engine, AA-5 elevators and modified engine mount, marketed as the T-Cat as trainer replacement for the Trainer and as the Lynx tourer to replace the Tr-2, 211 built.

Specifications (AA-1A)

See also

References

 BD-1 Pilot Evaluation Report from 1965
 BD-1 Sales brochure and pictures
 Stagg, Skip, Article – Ask a Man Who Owns One, Private Pilot Magazine(1997)
 Article – Gulfstream Yankee/Trainer AA-1, Aviation Consumer Used Airplane Guide (1989)
 Smith, Scott, Article The Grumman Yankee Fighter Fun – Trainer Price! USAviator, Airedale Press Inc., 3000 21st St-NW, Winter Haven, FL, 33881
 Stagg, Skip, Article – Grumman Where It All Began, Private Pilot Magazine (1997)
 Article – AGAC AA-1 Aviation Consumer
 Cox, Bill, Trusty Trainer, Plane & Pilot Magazine (1997)
 Gulfstream American Model AA-1 Yankee Owner's manual January 15, 1979
 Wilkinson, Stephan How It's Built, Flying magazine November 1968 The Yankees Are Here
 Hellman, Judy, How It Flies, Flying magazine November 1968 The Yankees Are Here
 Connes, Keith, How It Will Sell, Flying magazine November 1968 The Yankees Are Here
 Weeghman, Richard B., How It Is Backed, Flying magazine November 1968 The Yankees Are Here
 FAA Airworthiness Directive 73-13-07
 Grumman Gang AA-1 Specifications and production numbers
 Type Certificate

External links

 "Flying the Yankee." Popular Science, July 1969, pp. 72–74.

1960s United States civil utility aircraft
Single-engined tractor aircraft
Low-wing aircraft
AA-1
AA-1
Aircraft first flown in 1963